is the 24th single by Japanese singer/songwriter Chisato Moritaka. Written by Moritaka and Yuichi Takahashi, the single was released with "Watashi no Daiji na Hito" by One Up Music on October 10, 1994. It became her second of two singles to hit No. 1 on Oricon's singles chart (the first being "Kaze ni Fukarete" in 1993).

Background 
"Suteki na Tanjōbi" was used by Asahi Breweries for commercials promoting Asahi Z beer. "Watashi no Daiji na Hito (Single Version)" is taken from Moritaka's 1994 studio album Step by Step.

Moritaka performed "Suteki na Tanjōbi" on the 45th Kōhaku Uta Gassen.

Music video 
The music video for "Suteki na Tanjōbi" is set on a farm, with Moritaka playing drums while a masked man plays guitar.

Chart performance 
"Suteki na Tanjōbi"/"Watashi no Daiji na Hito" hit No. 1 on Oricon's singles chart and sold 380,000 copies. It was also certified Gold by the RIAJ.

Other versions 
Moritaka re-recorded the song and uploaded the video on her YouTube channel on January 30, 2013. This version is also included in Moritaka's 2013 self-covers DVD album Love Vol. 3.

Track listing 
All lyrics are written by Chisato Moritaka; all music is arranged by Yuichi Takahashi.

Personnel 
 Chisato Moritaka – vocals, drums
 Yuichi Takahashi – guitar, synthesizer, backing vocals
 Yukio Seto – bass
 Yasuaki Maejima – Fender Rhodes, synthesizer

Chart positions

Certification

Cover versions 
 Runa Miyoshida covered the song on her 2010 album Ska Flavor #3.

References

External links 
 
 
 

1994 singles
1994 songs
Japanese-language songs
Chisato Moritaka songs
Songs with lyrics by Chisato Moritaka
Oricon Weekly number-one singles
One Up Music singles